The 1973–74 Roller Hockey Champions Cup was the 9th edition of the Roller Hockey Champions Cup organized by CERH.

Barcelona achieved their second title.

Teams
The champions of the main European leagues, and Barcelona as title holders, played this competition, consisting in a double-legged knockout tournament.

Bracket

Source:

References

External links
 CERH website

1973 in roller hockey
1974 in roller hockey
Rink Hockey Euroleague